Dominik Suchý (born 13 November 1987) is a Czech bobsledder who has competed since 2007. At the 2010 Winter Olympics in Vancouver, he finished 12th in the four-man event.

Suchý's best World Cup finish was tenth in the four-man event at Lake Placid, New York in November 2009.

References
 

1987 births
Bobsledders at the 2010 Winter Olympics
Bobsledders at the 2014 Winter Olympics
Bobsledders at the 2018 Winter Olympics
Czech male bobsledders
Living people
Olympic bobsledders of the Czech Republic